Željko Božić (born September 29, 1974 in Belgrade, Serbia; died June 7, 2006) was a Serbian stuntman and actor.

Božić became internationally famous after winning stunt awards in Moscow and Belgrade, and as the founder of the Koloseum stunt awards open source stunt project. His film career has been long both in his home country and elsewhere.

His film work includes The Peacemaker (1997), Welcome to Sarajevo (1997), Gypsy Magic (1997), The Professional (2001), All the Invisible Children (2005), We are not Angels 2 (2004), Fade to Black (2005) and Made in YU (2004).

His name is sometimes spelled Zeliko Bozich in film credits.

Injured while performing dangerous stunt 
On 27 April 2006, Božić was severely injured when he performed a unique and extremely dangerous car stunt. He jumped from a height of 50 feet from a bridge and into a river, staying inside the car during the fall. This stunt demonstration was a promotion for the Koloseum International Stunt Festival which was supposed to be held in September, 2006.

Božić died on June 7, 2006, leaving behind his wife Milkica Božić and their two children.

Honors and awards 
 World stunt academy member - since 2001
 International stunt academician - since 2005
 Professor on Dramatic arts Academy BK - since 1997
 President of stuntmen's association of Serbia and Montenegro since 1999
 Founder of Koloseum Stunt Awards - Open source stunt festival project
 Award for the best automobile stunt - Moscow 2005
 Awards for the Apsolute stunt championship (3 place) - Moscow 2003)
 Award for the best high fall  - Belgrade 2005

References

External links
 
 Koloseum stunt awards
 Zeljko Bozic best friend Stuntman Marcelo the Daredevil
 In Loving Memory Of Zeljko Bozic

1974 births
2006 deaths
Male actors from Belgrade
Serbian male film actors
Serbian male television actors
Serbian stunt performers